Nassau Royale is a liqueur made by Bacardi. It is popular in Nassau, Bahamas, and Bahamian cuisine. The liqueur is used with whipped bananas and cream to top the Banana Royal dessert.

References

Liqueurs
Bahamian cuisine